Karlo Gericke Aspeling (born 13 December 1987) is a South African rugby union player for the  in the Currie Cup and in the Rugby Challenge. His regular position is fly-half.

Career

He started his career playing for local team  in the 2006 Under–19 and Under-21 Provincial Championship competitions.

He was included in the  Varsity Cup team in 2011 and in the  team in 2012, but failed to make an appearance.

He played in all 14 his team's matches that season, scoring 106 points.

The following season, he joined East London-based team  for the 2013 Vodacom Cup. Again, he played in all their games in that competition, scoring 66 points.

In 2014, Aspeling moved to Turin to play for Italian Serie A side CUS Ad Maiora. He started all ten of their matches during the 2014–2015 season and finished the season as their top scorer with 118 points.

References

South African rugby union players
Living people
1987 births
People from George, South Africa
Falcons (rugby union) players
Border Bulldogs players
SWD Eagles players
Eastern Province Elephants players
CSM București (rugby union) players
Rugby union fly-halves
Rugby union players from the Western Cape